Jo Nesbitt is a British illustrator, translator, and cartoonist. Most of her work focuses on women's issues, queer experience, and the intersectionality of both.

Personal life 
Nesbitt was born in Tyneside, England in the 1950s. Through her childhood years, she attended a Christian school for girls, which was run by nuns. In subsequent years, she attended London University to get a degree in English. Nesbitt moved to Holland in 1981, and she resides in Amsterdam, Netherlands since.

Growing up in the convent schooling system, Nesbitt came to be very familiar with religious imagery, such as the nun. She includes nuns along with other religious themes in many of her works, such as her contribution to Menstral Taboos and an illustration in her work The Desperate Woman's Guide to Diet and Exercise that depicts a nun laying on a sofa with grapes and wine saying, "Some vows I haven't taken..." Plus, Lynn Alderson wrote that Nesbitt was "responsible for the wonderful nun/whales that could be seen swimming around the walls of Sisterbite – she had a bit of a thing for nuns."

Career

Comics 
Due to the themes of feminism, queerness, and civil activism, Nesbitt's comics and illustrations often are featured as a part of larger feminist and queer works, such as Dyke Strippers, Gay Left Issue, and HERizons. Nesbitt also seemingly worked with the Sisterwrite book shop on multiple occasions, helping them set up the shop and creating cartoons for their catalogue. Nesbitt has a very consistent drawing style over most, if not all, of her works; whether she is making her own comic or drawing illustrations for someone else's book, she appears to put the same spirit into them all.

Translator 
I Have Heard about You: Foreign Women’s Writing Crossing the Dutch Border: From Sappho to Selma Lagerlöf by Suzanna van Dijk, translated by Jo Nesbitt

Works 
The Modern Ladies' Compendium by Jo Nesbitt

 The Modern Ladies' Compendium was widely promoted within magazines and catalogues, such as Broadsheet's Issue 144 and the Mushroom Bookshop Christmas Catalogue. Published by Virago, it is a comedy aimed at women that pokes fun at gender norms and social standards set for women in various situations.

Sourcream by Jo Nesbitt, Liz Mackie, Christine Roche, and Lesley Ruda

 Nesbitt worked on book 1 of Sourcream, published in 1979. There are two more books that were published in 1981 and 1982, respectively, but Nesbitt did not contribute to these anthologies. Nicola Streenten remarks in her paper The 1980s: An Alternative Direction for the Anger that Sourcream is notably "produced as a collection not a collective."

The Great Escape of Doreen Potts by Jo Nesbitt

 Included in Broadsheet's "On the Shelf" section under "Books for younger readers," The Great Escape of Doreen Potts is one of Nesbitt's more fantastical works. It is the story of the main character, Doreen Potts, and how she was kidnapped by two women, but she manages to escape.

The Desperate Woman's Guide to Diet and Exercise by Jo Nesbitt

 This comic serves as a comedy-centered commentary on women's dietary practices as influenced by Western culture.

Menstrual Taboos by the Matriarchy Study Group

 Menstrual Taboos is a collaborative work by Nesbitt along with Pauline Long, Monica Sjoo, Marie Lecko, Mary Ooghill, Pat Whiting, and Mary Coghill. It has heavy religious references, such as Christianity, Judaism, Moslems, and even ancient Mesopotamian religion. Overall, this work connects religion to the societal conversation around mensuration. Carol Lee's Matriarchy Study Group Papers from the Feminist Review, 1979 discusses Nesbitt's Religious Blood, Lee describing the writing as having "anger" and "power" regarding "me the hoax Christianity has perpetrated on women." 
A Feminist Sexual Politics: Now you see it, now you don't  by Beatrix Cambell, illustrated by Jo Nesbitt

 This article includes illustrations from Nesbitt. A critic of the article writes, "it is gloriously illustrated by Jo Nesbitt, who manages to keep you laughing rather than crying as you struggle through this piece."

Birth Over 35 by Sheila Kitzinger, illustrated by Jo Nesbitt

Second Class Disabled by Irene Loach and Ruth Lister, illustrated by Jo Nesbitt and Sam Smith

References 

Living people
Wikipedia Student Program
LGBT comics creators
British comics artists
Cartoonists
Year of birth missing (living people)